The Termoli–Venafro railway is a railway line in Molise, Italy.

History 
The line was opened in different sections between 1886 and 1900.

See also 
 Termoli-Campobasso Railway
 List of railway lines in Italy

References

Bibliography 
 RFI - Fascicolo linea 127

External links 

Railway lines in Molise
Railway lines opened in 1900